Sikukh is a rural locality (a selo) in Guninsky Selsoviet, Tabasaransky District, Republic of Dagestan, Russia. The population was 200 as of 2010. There are 2 streets.

Geography 
Sikukh is located 21 km southwest of Khuchni (the district's administrative centre) by road. Kyuryag is the nearest rural locality.

References 

Rural localities in Tabasaransky District